Towton  is a small village and civil parish in the Selby District of North Yorkshire, England. It was historically part of the West Riding of Yorkshire until 1974.

History
In 2010 and 2011 a pair of gold torcs dating to the Iron Age were discovered by metal detectorists. The 'Towton torcs' were acquired by the Yorkshire Museum in 2013.

The village is best known for the Battle of Towton, fought on Palm Sunday, 29 March 1461, during the Wars of the Roses. It was at this battle that Sir David Ap Mathew saved the life of Edward IV. Once King, Edward granted Sir David Ap Mathew permission to use 'Towton' on the Mathew family crest.

The battle has been described as "probably the largest and bloodiest battle ever fought on English soil."

References

Civil parishes in North Yorkshire
Selby District
Villages in North Yorkshire